The Sears Women's Classic was a golf tournament on the LPGA Tour from 1971 to 1974. It was played at the Port St. Lucie Country Club, Sinners Course in Port St. Lucie, Florida. In 1971, the format was 54 holes of stroke play. From 1972 to 1974, the format changed to two rounds of match play to reduce the field from 64 to 16 players, followed by one round of stroke play.

Winners
Sears Women's Classic
1974 Gail Denenberg
1973 Carol Mann

Sears Women's World Classic
1972 Betsy Cullen
1971 Ruth Jessen

References

Former LPGA Tour events
Golf in Florida
Women's sports in Florida
Recurring sporting events established in 1971
Recurring sporting events disestablished in 1974
1971 establishments in Florida
1974 disestablishments in Florida